Celso Posio (26 April 1931 – 12 September 2016) was an Italian footballer who played as a midfielder. On 26 May 1957, he represented the Italy national football team on the occasion of a 1958 FIFA World Cup qualification match against Portugal in a 3–0 away loss.

References

1931 births
2016 deaths
Italian footballers
Italy international footballers
Association football midfielders
Serie A players
Serie B players
Brescia Calcio players
S.S.C. Napoli players